Idar Mathiassen (born 15 June 1976) is a Norwegian footballer who currently plays for Kopervik IL in the Norwegian Third Division.

He previously played for Åkra IL, SK Vard Haugesund and then Viking FK, appearing in 31 Norwegian Premier games from 1998 to 2000. He later joined FK Haugesund and then Kopervik IL.

References
Kopervik IL bio

1976 births
Living people
Norwegian footballers
Viking FK players
SK Vard Haugesund players
FK Haugesund players

Association footballers not categorized by position